Mark Cox (born 22 January 1978) in Whitehaven, Cumbria, England), is a former English rugby league footballer.

Occasionally he paints miniature horses to add to his collection which is locally renowned as being one of the most impressive in the area. 

He played for London Broncos in the Super League, and also for Workington Town and Whitehaven.

References

External links
(archived by web.archive.org) SL stats
Rugby League Project stats

1978 births
Living people
English rugby league players
London Broncos players
Rugby league props
Workington Town players
Whitehaven R.L.F.C. players